Hindrik Ostrat (21 May 1871 Kudina Parish (now Jõgeva Parish), Kreis Dorpat – 1940) was an Estonian politician. He was a member of II Riigikogu.

References

1871 births
1940 deaths
People from Jõgeva Parish
People from Kreis Dorpat
Settlers' Party politicians
Members of the Riigikogu, 1923–1926